The Schreierstoren (English incorrectly translated as: Weeper's Tower), originally part of the medieval city wall of Amsterdam, the Netherlands, was built in the 15th century. It was the location from which Henry Hudson set sail on his journey to Northern America. This expedition would lead to the discovery of the island of Manhattan, among others. It was built as a defense tower in 1487. It is currently a café and nautical bookstore. The old name was 'Schreyhoeckstoren' meaning in old Dutch the sharp angle of the tower with the once-connected city walls. Later the name began to be shortened to the Schreierstoren. 

 
Schreierstoren is known mainly for the fact that women wept there for their husbands, who would leave from that port, to go to war, or to fish. (Most of the weeping that was done was for the fishermen who left from that port.) While many in history have called this (the weeping, that is) a myth, there is one thing that may prove this a fact: there is a “memory tablet” in the tower, dating back to 1566, which “commemorates” a woman who was so “heart-grieved” at the departure of her husband, that she went insane.

References

External links
Schreierstoren

Rijksmonuments in Amsterdam
Towers in Amsterdam